Turneriapostomma is a species of ant in the genus Turneria. Described by Shattuck in 1990, the species is endemic to Papua New Guinea.

References

Dolichoderinae
Insects described in 1990
Insects of Papua New Guinea